The 1996 Chinese Jia-A League (known as Marlboro Jia-A League for sponsorship reasons) was the third season of professional association football and the 35th top-tier overall league season held in China. Starting on April 14th 1996 and ending on October 27th 1996 saw Dalian Wanda win their second championship title.

Promotion and relegation
Teams promoted from 1995 Chinese Jia-B League

Shenzhen Feiyada
Guangzhou Songri

Teams relegated from 1995 Chinese Jia-A League

Qingdao Hainiu
Liaoning F.C.

Overview
It was contested by 12 teams, and Dalian Wanda won the championship.

League standings

Awards
Player of the year (Golden Ball Award)
Su Maozhen (Jinan Taishan Jiangjun)

Top scorer (Golden Boot Award)
Su Maozhen (Jinan Taishan Jiangjun)

Manager of the year
Chi Shangbin (Dalian Wanda)

Best Referee
Lu Jun

CFA Team of the Year

Goalkeeper: Han Wenhai (Dalian Wanda)

Defence: Wei Qun (Sichuan Quanxing), Xu Hong (Dalian Wanda), Zhang Enhua (Dalian Wanda), Wu Chengying (Shanghai Shenhua)

Midfield: Peng Weiguo (Guangzhou Songri), Fan Zhiyi (Shanghai Shenhua), Ma Mingyu (Guangdong Hongyuan), Cao Xiandong

Attack: Hao Haidong (August 1), Gao Feng (Beijing Guoan),

See also
Chinese Jia-A League
Chinese Super League
Chinese Football Association Jia League
Chinese Football Association Yi League
Chinese FA Cup
Chinese Football Association
Football in China
List of football records in China
Chinese clubs in the AFC Champions League

References
China - List of final tables (RSSSF)

Chinese Jia-A League seasons
1
China
China
1996 establishments in China